Kota Setia is a mukim and town in Perak Tengah District, Perak, Malaysia.

Perak Tengah District
Mukims of Perak
Towns in Perak